
Charles Cumberland (21 May 1764 – 12 May 1835) was an English cricketer of the late 18th and early 19th centuries who is known to have played in 26 matches which are retrospectively rated first-class.

Cumberland's known cricket career spanned the 1787 to 1805 seasons. Though mostly associated with Marylebone Cricket Club (MCC) and its predecessor the White Conduit Club, he also played for England XIs as well as county teams associated with Hampshire, Kent and Middlesex and for other sides. Cumberland was an accomplished underarm bowler. In his first-class career, he took 76 wickets in his 26 matches, twice achieving ten in a match.

Cricket career
Cumberland was born in 1764 and attended Westminster School. He is known to have lived in Tunbridge Wells. He joined the British Army and attained the rank of captain while he was still playing cricket. He was a member of the White Conduit Club and the earliest cricket match he is known to have played in was in June 1787 at the newly established Lord's Old Ground against a Middlesex XI. One newspaper reported that "the excellence of Mr Cumberland's bowling is well known", and another that "Mr Cumberland's bowling was much commended".

Having injured his ankle by "attempting to leap over a rail", he missed the next White Conduit v Middlesex match at Lord's on later in the same month. The match report described him as "second to none as a bowler and second to few as a fieldsman".

In September 1790, he played in two matches for Tunbridge Wells Cricket Club against Brighton. He took six wickets in the first match and then six in one innings in the return. By May 1791, Cumberland had risen to the rank of captain when he made his first-class debut for the Gentlemen of England against Old Etonians at Lord's. He took ten wickets in the match, five in each innings.

He is known to have played in a total of 44 matches, 26 of which have been given first-class status until his final matches in 1805. He played 22 matches in the three seasons from 1791 to 1793, regularly playing for MCC at Lord's. In June 1791, he travelled to Rutland for four matches at Burley Park, a ground owned by cricket's leading patron George Finch, 9th Earl of Winchilsea. In 1793 he played in ten first-class matches, mostly for MCC.

Cumberland played for MCC against the Thursday Club in June 1799, his only known match between August 1797 and June 1802. He returned to play for George Leycester's XI against Charles Lennox's XI at Lord's in 1802, but was not recorded again until 1804 when he played five matches for MCC. His final appearance in first-class matches was for MCC against an England XI at Lord's in July 1804, taking just one wicket, and his last known match was for MCC against Homerton at Lord's in June 1805. Aged 41, he took ten wickets in the match, including seven in the second innings.

Notes

References

Sources
 G. B. Buckley, Fresh Light on 18th Century Cricket, Cotterell, 1935.
 Arthur Haygarth, Scores & Biographies, Vol. I (1744–1826), Lillywhite, 1862.
 H. T. Waghorn, The Dawn of Cricket, Electric Press, 1906.

External links
 

1764 births
1835 deaths
English cricketers of 1787 to 1825
English cricketers
Gentlemen of England cricketers
Gentlemen of Kent cricketers
Hampshire cricketers
Kent cricketers
Marylebone Cricket Club and Homerton cricketers
Marylebone Cricket Club cricketers
Middlesex cricketers
Non-international England cricketers
Old Westminsters cricketers
Surrey and Marylebone Cricket Club cricketers
White Conduit Club cricketers